Conrad Arnholt Smith (aka Conrad Arnholdt Smith) (March 13, 1899 in Walla Walla, Washington – June 8, 1996 in Del Mar, California) was a leading businessman and civic activist in San Diego, California.

Personal life
Smith was born in Walla Walla, Washington. His family fled to San Diego in 1907 when his father faced prison for perjury in a political case. Smith grew up poor and never finished high school. He became a bank teller, and impressed A.P. Giannini, who moved him rapidly up the ranks of the Bank of Italy (now the Bank of America). He married his first wife Lois Seaver Smith in 1922. He had one son, C. Arnholt Smith Jr. and a daughter, Carol Smith Shannon. In the 1970s, he married Maria Helen Alvarez.

Businessman
With financial help from his brother in the oil business, Smith bought the United States National Bank in 1933.  Smith was an entrepreneur with diversified investments, and became the most prominent civic leader in San Diego.

He owned the largest bank in the city, had major interests in the tuna industry and real estate, and owned the San Diego Padres of the National League from their inception through .  Originally, he purchased the minor league Padres of the Pacific Coast League in 1955. He was awarded one of two National League expansion franchises slated to start in the  season (along with the Montreal Expos).  After failing in an attempt to move the Padres to Washington, D.C., he sold the team to McDonald's founder Ray Kroc.

Smith was a close friend of President Richard M. Nixon, and was with him on election night when Nixon won the presidency in 1968.  Smith raised a reported $1 million for Nixon's 1968 presidential campaign, including $250,000 from him personally.  Smith donated $200,000 to his re-election campaign in 1972, but the money was returned because Smith was under investigation by the SEC and IRS.

Smith was the head of Westgate-California Corporation, a conglomerate which had interests in real estate, seafood canneries, silver mines, and transportation companies. Smith was a major investor in San Diego's third largest industry, tuna.  When Japan started offering cheaper tuna after 1950, Smith worked to break the union using new technology and Peruvian canneries.

Prison
Smith's base was ownership of the United States National Bank in San Diego, of which he had purchased controlling interest in 1933.  The bank grew to become the 86th largest bank in the country with $1.2 billion in total assets.  The bank failed in October 1973, at which time it was the largest bank failure in history, due to an excessive level of bad loans to Smith-controlled companies, which exceeded the bank's legal lending limit.  In August 1973, the Internal Revenue Service sued Smith for $23 million for back taxes.  The IRS filed criminal charges in the case but they were later dropped.  In 1975, Smith pleaded no contest to bank fraud charges and was placed on probation and fined $30,000.  That same year, Smith was sued by the Federal Deposit Insurance Corporation for $45 million for engaging in  "unsafe and unsound" banking practices.  In 1977, a judge ordered Smith jailed for contempt because he refused to answer questions regarding his personal finances.  In 1979, Smith was convicted of embezzlement of $8.9 million and tax fraud, involving his sale of the San Diego Padres. He served eight months in a county minimum-security Work Furlough Center in 1984 and 1985; his sentence was reduced due to his poor health.  He died in 1996 of congestive heart failure at age 97.

Notes

External links
 Noble, Holcombe B. "C. Arnholt Smith, 97, Banker And Padres Chief Before a Fall". The New York Times. June 11, 1996.
"San Diego Tycoon C. Arnholt Smith Dies". Los Angeles Times. June 10, 1996.
San Diego Padres owners
"Smith Solicits Governor's Aid in Freedom Bid". Los Angeles Times. April 13, 1985.
"Banking: The Westgate Scandal". Time. October 9, 1973.
"Final Chapter Written in Saga of Westgate AP". The New York Times. May 6, 1982.

1899 births
1996 deaths
Major League Baseball owners
San Diego Padres owners
Businesspeople from San Diego
People from Walla Walla, Washington
American bankers
American white-collar criminals
American businesspeople convicted of crimes
20th-century American businesspeople